Moon Sang-yun (born 9 January 1991) is a South Korean footballer who plays as a midfielder for Gwangju FC of K League 2.

External links 

Moon Sang-yun at Asian Games Incheon 2014

1991 births
Living people
Association football midfielders
South Korean footballers
Incheon United FC players
Jeonbuk Hyundai Motors players
Jeju United FC players
Seongnam FC players
Seoul E-Land FC players
Gwangju FC players
K League 1 players
K League 2 players
Ajou University alumni
Footballers at the 2014 Asian Games
Asian Games medalists in football
Asian Games gold medalists for South Korea
People from Miryang
South Korean Buddhists
Medalists at the 2014 Asian Games
Sportspeople from South Gyeongsang Province